TIN may refer to:

 Tax identification number, used for tax purposes in the United States
 Tindouf Airport (IATA code), in Tindouf, Algeria
 Titanium nitride (TiN), a ceramic material
 Triangulated irregular network, a geometric data structure

See also 
 Tin, a metal
 Tin (disambiguation)